Stenoporpia excelsaria is a species of geometrid moth in the family Geometridae. It is found in North America.

The MONA or Hodges number for Stenoporpia excelsaria is 6474.

Subspecies
These two subspecies belong to the species Stenoporpia excelsaria:
 Stenoporpia excelsaria excelsaria
 Stenoporpia excelsaria pullata Rindge, 1968

References

Further reading

External links

 

Boarmiini
Articles created by Qbugbot
Moths described in 1899